RBB Fernsehen (stylized as rbb fernsehen) is a German free-to-air television channel owned and operated by Rundfunk Berlin-Brandenburg (RBB) and serving Berlin and Brandenburg. It is one of the seven regional "third programmes" that are offered within the federal ARD network.

History
On 1 May 2003, ORB-Fernsehen was renamed to RBB Brandenburg and SFB1 to RBB Berlin. However, until 28 February 2004, two different programs continued to be broadcast. On 10 November 2003, the joint broadcasts rbb um 6 and zibb – zuhause in Berlin und Brandenburg started. On February 29, 2004, the merger of both stations to rbb Fernsehen took place. In the summer of 2004, the program Im Palais went on the air and from 23 September 2004, Kurt Krömer started his own show. On January 23, 2007, polar bear Knut made his first appearance in a contribution to the Berliner Abendschau, which later triggered a Knut cult. From then on the rbb produced several documentaries about the polar bear for rbb Fernsehen and Das Erste. On 5 September 2009 rbb Fernsehen and Arte broadcast the 24-hour documentary about Berlin in real time 24h Berlin. This was shot exactly one year before by 80 shooting teams in HD quality. Until November 2009, Michael Kessler drove through Berlin with the in October 2006 started Berliner Nacht-Taxe.

At the end of 2009, the rbb announced the cessation of the cinema magazine Filmvorführer and the environmental and science program  which was already aired at Deutscher Fernsehfunk since November 1989. Ozon should be divided into the two formats "Ozon – Die Reportage" and "Ozon – Der Film", which should deal in 30 minutes only with a theme of science and environmental protection. The programs projectionist was set at the end of 2009. After protests against the cessation of Ozon the program has been continued since May 2010 as a monothematic report unter the OZON unterwegs label. Since 10 May 2010, Brandenburg aktuell is broadcast with a new design and a newly designed studio. As of 23 August 2010, a new series with Michael Kessler (Kesslers Expedition) was started.

Since 13 August 2012, rbb Fernsehen broadcast with a new design and the new slogan Das volle Programm ("The full program"). In addition to an expanded regional offer, documentation and entertainment were also be broadcast.

On 28 August 2017, design and slogan were changed again. Bloß nicht langweilen ("Do not get bored") replaced Das volle Programm.

Distribution

Regional variations
There is a separate program window broadcast every day for 30 minutes starting at 7.30 pm where Brandenburg aktuell is broadcast on the Brandenburg transmitters and Berliner Abendschau on the Berlin one's.

HDTV
rbb Fernsehen started broadcasting in HD quality (720p) via Astra 19.2°E on 5 December 2013.

Logo history

Programming

Children
Sandmännchen (2004–present)
Die Sendung mit dem Elefanten (2020–present)

Entertainment
Das große Kleinkunstfestival, hosted by Dieter Nuhr (2004–present)
Die Abendshow (2017–present)

Information

Berliner Abendschau (1958–present)
Brandenburg aktuell (1992–present)
Łužyca (broadcast in Lower Sorbian language)
Quivive (2004-2010)
rbb 24 (2018–present)
rbb Praxis (2011–present)
rbb um 6 (2004–present)
Täter - Opfer - Polizei (2004–present)

Series

Sport
Sportplatz (2004–2017)

Talk
Dickes B. (2007–2012)
Thadeusz und die Beobachter, hosted by Jörg Thadeusz (2013–present)

References

External links

 

Rundfunk Berlin-Brandenburg
ARD (broadcaster)
Television stations in Germany
Television channels and stations established in 2004
2004 establishments in Germany
Mass media in Berlin
Mass media in Potsdam
German-language television stations